A list of films released in Japan in 1981 (see 1981 in film).

See also
1981 in Japan
1981 in Japanese television

References

Footnotes

Sources

External links
 Japanese films of 1981 at the Internet Movie Database

1981
Japanese
Films